Unmu-do is an 80 ha island in the north-eastern Yellow Sea lying about 19 km off the western coast of North Korea.  The site has been identified by BirdLife International as an Important Bird Area (IBA) because it supports endangered black-faced spoonbills.

References

Important Bird Areas of North Korea
Islands of North Korea
North Pyongan